The First cabinet of Louis Mathieu Molé was announced on 6 September 1836 by King Louis Philippe I.
It replaced the First cabinet of Adolphe Thiers.

On 19 September 1836 the Ministry of Commerce was replaced by the Ministry of Public Works, Agriculture and Commerce.
Following an insurrection on 30 October 1836 in Strasbourg, on 24 January 1837 the Minister of War, Bernard, introduced a draft law that would stop prosection of crimes committed by the military and the civil authorities during the riots. 
Discussion began in the Chamber of Deputies on 28 February and continued until 7 March, when it was rejected by the deputies.
This caused a ministerial crisis.
The cabinet was dissolved on 15 April 1837, replaced by the Second cabinet of Louis Mathieu Molé.

Ministers

The cabinet was created by ordinance of 6 September 1836. The ministers were:
 President of the Council: Louis-Mathieu Molé
 War: Simon, général-baron Bernard
 Justice: Jean-Charles Persil
 Foreign Affairs: Louis-Mathieu Molé
 Interior:
 Adrien de Gasparin, Minister
 Charles de Rémusat, Sub-secretary of State (from 8 September 1836)
 Finance: Tanneguy Duchâtel
 Navy and Colonies: Claude du Campe de Rosamel
 Public Education: François Guizot
 Commerce: Tanneguy Duchâtel (to 19 September 1836)
 Public Works, Agriculture and Commerce: Nicolas Martin du Nord (from 19 September 1836)

References

Sources

French governments
1836 establishments in France
1837 disestablishments in France
Cabinets established in 1836
Cabinets disestablished in 1837